Bablin may refer to:
Bablin, West Virginia, a community in Lewis County, West Virginia
Bąblin, a village in Oborniki County, Poland